The Liberia Destiny Party (LDP) is a political party in Liberia. It fielded candidates in the 11 October 2005 elections.

LDP candidate Nathaniel Barnes won 1.0% of the vote in the presidential poll. The party failed to win any seats in the Senate or House of Representatives.

Political parties in Liberia